Jamie Pollock (born October 18, 1989) is an American soccer midfielder. She last played for semi-professional Australian club South Melbourne FC.

Early life
Raised in Powder Springs, Georgia, Pollock attended Harrison High School where she was named MVP, captain of the soccer team, and most athletic female during her senior year in 2008. She was named the school's most valuable offensive player for four consecutive years in 2005–2008 as she led Harrison as the team's highest scorer. In 2007, she was named NSCAA Youth All-American.

Pollock played club soccer for Tophat 08 Gold from 2005 to 2007. In 2007, she captained the team to the Georgia state championship. She also played for the regional and state Olympic Development Program (ODP) teams helping win the State ODP National Championship in 2005 and the Georgia state championship in 2003, 2004, and 2007.

In October 2015, Pollock was inducted into Harrison's Hall of Fame.

University of Georgia Bulldogs, 2009–2012
Pollock attended the University of Georgia from 2009 to 2012 where she started in every game she played for the Georgia Bulldogs. As a sophomore, Pollock was named to Soccer America National Team of the Week after scoring two goals against Florida Atlantic University. She was also and MVP of the Georgia Nike Invitational. Her six goals and one assist (13 points) on the season ranked third for the team. Following her junior season when she scored two goals and two assists, Pollock was named to the TopDrawerSoccer Watch List. As a senior in 2011, Pollock was named to the All-SEC first team. She finished her collegiate career with 12 goals and 8 assists.

Playing career

Atlanta and Boston, 2011–2014
In 2012, Pollock was offered a spot on the Atlanta Beat by head coach James Galanis; however, the WPS folded before the 2012 season began. She joined the Atlanta Silverbacks in the USL W-League where she helped the team win the national championship in 2011 and later played for the reserve team for the Boston Breakers.

Melbourne Victory, 2015–present
In 2015, Pollock signed with the Melbourne Victory for the 2015–16 W-League season.

In 2020, after a decorated career with South Melbourne FC, Pollock returned to the United States.

References

External links
 Georgia player profile 
 

1989 births
Living people
Melbourne Victory FC (A-League Women) players
A-League Women players
American women's soccer players
Georgia Bulldogs women's soccer players
Atlanta Silverbacks Women players
Women's association football midfielders
Soccer players from Georgia (U.S. state)
People from Powder Springs, Georgia
Sportspeople from Cobb County, Georgia
American expatriate women's soccer players
Expatriate women's soccer players in Australia
American expatriate sportspeople in Australia